Chumani is a South African given name. Notable people with the name include:

Chumani Booi (born 1980), South African rugby union player and coach
Chumani Maxwele (born 1985), South African political activist
Chumani Pan (born 1985), South African actor

African given names